, is a 1995 Japanese tokusatsu television series. B-Fighter is short for "Beetle Fighter". It was part of Toei's Metal Hero Series franchise. It dealt with three members of the prestigious  fighting against the evil forces of the otherworldly Jamahl Empire. The action footage and props were used for Big Bad Beetleborgs and it has a sequel called B-Fighter Kabuto.

Storyline
Insects all over the world begin to swarm for unknown reasons, with other animals and plants acting strangely as well. To investigate this, Takuya Kai is dispatched with an Earth Academia group. Investigating independently, Takuya finds Guru who reveals that insects are preparing for battle against invaders from another dimension. Offering their aid, the Earth Academia create suits of armor to combat the threat as the Jamahl arrive to Earth to enslave humans. Though they have trouble perfecting the Bio-Machinery, Guru arrives to infuse the armor with the life force of many insects. Once the suits become the B-Commanders, one suit chooses Takuya while the other two bond to Daisaku Katagiri and Rei Hayama. With their newfound power, the B-Fighters fight to drive back Jamahl's forces.

Characters

The B-Fighters
The members use Bio-armor developed by the Earth Academia's brightest and infused with the life force of insects.

  is a 23-year-old entomologist at the Earth Academia Japan Branch and is the team leader. He is very tender-hearted. His sense of responsibility is very strong. The first to meet Guru in the South American rainforest, he was also the first to gain a B-Commander and use his suit. As Blue Beet, his armor was modeled after a male Japanese rhinoceros beetle. His blood was used in the creation of his "evil twin", Shadow. After learning the true colors of the shadow, he feels responsible and goes missing. In the second half of the series, Blue Beet gained the ability to evolve into  by the command .
  at 23, is an impetuous but nature-loving man. A tree doctor, Daisaku claims to be able to hear trees and plants when they are dying. He was captured along with Rei by the Jamahl during the start of the invasion of Earth. Upon receiving his B-Commander, Daisaku made quick work of Jamar soldiers. He was aquaphobic until he overcame his fear to save his father Daitetsu Katagiri, a fisherman, from a trap laid by the Ebikaania. As the most physically powerful of the B-Fighters, G-Stag's armor is modeled after a stag beetle. G-Stag is strong enough to lift the Jamar soldiers and toss them around like rag dolls.
  is the moniker of the lone female B-Fighter in red armor modeled after a female Japanese rhinoceros beetle and the fastest and most nimble of the B-Fighters assumed by its original user and her successor.
  is a 22-year-old animal instructor at Earth Academia's Aquarium. Captured along with Daisaku at first and receiving her B-Commander at the same time, she demolished the Jamar soldiers before joining forces with Takuya and Daisaku. She eventually left for the South American branch of Earth Academia to do research and help with protecting the wildlife there.
  is Rei's successor, a young and cheerful 19-year-old student who was "chosen" by Rei's B-Commander as the next Reddle. Mai has a positive look on life and tries to see the good in everything. She also has a love for Daisaku Katagiri and animals.

Allies
  is the chief of the Earth Academia's Japanese branch, dedicated to the pursuit of justice. He fell in love with Sayuri, a plant researcher, many years ago, but left her. He works as a "mentor" for the B-Fighters, usually working at Earth Academia to assist the team by leading research on Jamahl's warriors and developing new weaponry and vehicles for the B-Fighters.
  is the elder of the insect tribe, and looks like a big brown rhinobeetle. He carries a staff with a curled top and was the one who gave the B-Fighters their powers. Guru possesses great mystical power of his own.
  is another insect warrior. Drago lost any memory of his past until his fight with Blue Beet restores it. His powers are dragonfly-based. Once learning who he really was, he helped the B-Fighters defeat Hellsgyra.
  is one of Jera's mercenaries who fights the B-Fighters for the money. When Mai scolds him for following Jera and ultimately Jamahl for money, Gorgodal quits and tries to return the money he has been paid. But Gaohm didn't accept this and brainwashes Gorgodal so that he is nothing but a raging monster. Mai tries to talk to him again, but he can barely remember her name. Reddle eventually destroys Gorgodal by using her Saber Magnum. He is given a burial and his grave is marked with his own shuriken.
  is a scientist from the Aroa dimension who falls in love with Takuya.
  is a ghost called forth by one of Jera's soldiers, who breaks free of his control and helps fight against him.
  is originally Kazuma Iwata, a reckless biker. He is put in Jamhal's "Survival School" with Mai, who tries to get him and the other captured people out of the School. Kazuma is brainwashed and changed into an evil warrior by a machine used by Jera. The control device is in his bike's fairing, and when that was destroyed, Night Biker changed back into back to normal Kazuma.
  appears first as an old woman in a brown kimono with a brown cloth over her head and a wooden cask on her back. She can suck people inside the cask, which she uses to turn them into pickles for sale to creatures in other dimensions. She later revealed her true form, a demonic creature that can sprout and attack with claws and fangs. Babamba is not truly evil, and although Jera tries to trick her into fighting the B-Fighters, an old man who had befriended her convinces her that she doesn't need to fight anymore. She decides to stay in this dimension with him and shatters her cask freeing the people inside.
  is a so-called bodyguard from another dimension who wears cowboy-like attire. He appears during a fight and offers Jera his services, but in the fight he misses the B-Fighters and escapes back to Jamahl for his pay. Later, he approaches the B-Fighters and claimed that he was just trying to infiltrate Jamahl to take out Gaohm, and if they pay him he would do just that. Mai believes him and scrounges up enough to pay him. Nero is planning to take money from both sides and leave this dimension, when Mai discovers that he has Jamahl money. Jera also appears, having discovered his secret, impales Nero. Meanwhile, Mai had scanned Nero's gun, learning that it was designed to miss. Nero hates war, and never means to kill anyone. He dies after telling Mai to end the fight quickly, because war is a terrible thing.
  is a contestant in Jamahl's "Ghost Zone" battle, for which they kidnapped the B-Fighters and sent them to another dimension where they forced them to participate in combat. Daisaku soon learned that Sinbad was infiltrating Jamahl in an attempt to assassinate Gaohm for destroying his homeworld. Gaohm learned of this, however, and sent a resurrected Death Mult to kill Sinbad and the B-Fighters. Realizing that the only way for the B-Fighters to return home was by the explosion caused by Death Mult's demise, Sinbad kamikazed Death Mult and killed them both. Before the B-Fighters became free and left the dimension, Sinbad asked them to defeat Gaohm and the Jamahl.
  is Guru's son who left his father a hundred years ago and has been traveling across the dimensions as a supplier of weapons and equipment. He returns to Earth to visit his mother's grave, bringing the Beet Ingram with him. Very childish and naive, Kabuto often tries to be a hero, only to put himself in danger. He returns at the end of the series to assist the other Metal Heroes in defeating Jagul.
  is a legendary "butterfly of life" who can grant immortality. She appears when the life on a world has been destroyed. She then revives the world by giving it new life. Saint Papilia already appeared once on Earth, after the Ice Age, and revived the Earth so the life of today could be born and grow. Saint Papilia has also revived Muscle during the course of her existence. Both Gaohm and Black Beet sought Saint Papilia in the hopes of obtaining her gift of eternal life. After defeating Shadow, Takuya was severely wounded and died. Saint Papilia appeared above him and resurrected him, saying that Earth still needed him.
  is a mysterious armored amphibious alien who arrives on Earth with a shining feather that belongs to Saint Papilia. He was once healed by her power, and has followed clues about her to Earth. Already weakened upon his arrival on Earth, Muscle confronts both the B-Fighters and the Jamahl forces, only to be killed by Black Beet. Black Beet then gains possession of Papilia's feather. He is more of a guest character than a malevolent alien.
 Janperson and Gun Gibson (52 & 53) are robotic detective heroes from the 1993 Metal Hero Series Tokusou Robo Janperson. They assisted the B-Fighters in their battle against Jagul at the end of the series.
  (52 & 53) are a trio of special, heavily armed alien-destroying heroes composed of Show Narumi, Sara Misugi, and Sig. They were three main heroes from the 1994 Metal Hero Series Blue SWAT. Sara and Mai were captured by Jagul. Show, Sig, Janperson and Gun Gibson rescued the B-Fighters.

Arsenal
  are the B-Fighters' transformation and communication devices. The B-Fighters' bio-armor suits are stored in a shrunken form within the B-Commanders. The B-Commanders later disappear with Guru's death in B-Fighter Kabuto.
 : The Input Magnum is the B-Fighters' sidearm. It has a ten-key pad on the side, and by keying in different combinations of three numbers the gun can fire a variety of different projectiles, although not all of these are used in the show.
 110: Beam Mode (can also be used in Saber Magnum mode)
 119: Fire Extinguishing Mode or Cooling Mode
 010: Freezing Mode
 818: Flame Mode
 964: Flash Mode
 108: Ultrasonic Beam
 026: Boiling Water Mode
 289: Magnetic Beam
 305: Torimochi Bullets
 264: Flash Bullets
 967: Anti-Gravity Beam
 049: Rescue Signal
 088: Laughing Gas
 409: Anesthetic
 054: Recovery
  are the B-Fighters' signature wrist-mounted weapons.
  is Blue Beet's triangular sword-like Stinger Weapon. Its powerful attack is the 
  is G-Stag's Stinger Weapon, a large yellow pincer-like claw that he can use to crush enemies or grab them.
  is Reddle's Stinger Weapon. It has an array of 4 red beam emitters that fire powerful beams of red ion energy.
  is an augmented Stinger Weapon used by Blue Beet after a fight with Black Beet damaged the Stinger Blade. A large drill attaches to the wrist-piece of the Stinger Weapon. It first appeared in episode 21.
  are short swords modeled after a Hercules Beetle with a gold blade which first appeared in episode 22. Used by each of the B-Fighters, they have voice-activated features and can be used with Mega Herakles. The Pulsaber can also attach to the top of the Input Magnum to form the Saber Magnum.
  is a combination of the Input Magnums and Pulsabers. The Maxim Boiling Water mode was used in Episode 26 in a finishing strike led by G Stag.
  is a red and white semi-automatic-like double-barreled gun. Its legend is that it can only be used by a great hero. The top of the Beet Ingram can fold forward and over the barrels so that they are covered by a single barrel with two pincerlike armatures protruding from it. The Beet Ingram is seen in a flashback in B-Fighter Kabuto episode 35.
  is the B-Fighters' ultrasonic wave attack.
 Training Robots (2 & 36): Three robot drones built for the B-Fighters to test their arsenal on.
 EIG (11): Short for Electronic Intense Heat Gun, is an experimental thermal laser that shoots a beam of intense heat. It was once used by the B-Fighters when they needed to disable Ikari Bomber's self-detonation chip to defeat him.

Beet Machines
The  are the mecha used by the B-Fighters to fight the Jamahl fighter jets, usually summoned by the command, "Beet Machines, launch!" They are housed within the Heavy Shell Base (重甲基地, Jukou Kichi), a large hangar base located beneath the Earth Academia's parking lot; when summoned, the base rises out of the ground, allowing the vehicles to exit (the Beetluder from the front, the Stagger Tank from the right side, and the Red Gyro from the top).

  is Blue Beet's Beet Machine. It can attach the  concealed within the Stagger Tank onto its horn also in Flap Formation.
  is G-Stag's Beet Machine. It can attach the  stored in the Beetluder in Flap Formation onto its grabbers.
  is Reddle's Beet Machine. It contains the  that can be used with the Beetluder's Magnet Attachment to lift objects.
  is the  based on a Hercules Beetle and controlled with the Pulsabers. It comes via the command "Mega Herakles, launch!". It carries the three mecha of the B-Fighters into battle.

Jamahl
The  are beings from another dimension. It had an opening where the palm would be, where the Jamar fighter jets emerged from and where Jamahl's new super-weapons were located.

  is the mysterious leader of the Jamahl, who first appeared as a tall figure with a white and purple robe and chitinous face. Arriving to Earth, Gaohm planned to make the Tokyo Metropolitan Government Building his base until the B-Fighters intervened. He was supposedly killed by the B-Fighters later on, only to reappear as a gigantic torso floating in space with an exposed purple heart, a single one arm (the right one) and wires running all through and over/on his body. However, both forms were dummies used by the real Gaohm, a small embryonic entity in a tank full of liquid. Gaohm reveals that he was born from a space warp and wandered through space until he gained enough power to assemble the Jamahl for his lifelong goal of capturing Saint Papilia so he can obtain immortality. Gaohm plans to capture her and force her to give Gaohm immortality. After he creates the Jamahl Hole, he is killed when his fortress crashes on Earth. Gaohm was later revived/absorbed by Jagul in the series finale.
 : A commander in a leotard-like red and pink costume who wears a white mannequin-like face mask and red beret. Outside of battle, she wears a red robe that hampers her full strength. She uses an electromagnetic whip that she could charge with energy, as a weapon. Jera developed a grudge against the B-Fighter since the death of her beloved friend Barla, with Gaohm forcing her not to be consumed by her petty need to avenge her comrade. She assumes human form named . She turns against Gaohm upon learning of Gigaro's death by his hand, allying herself only with Shadow/Black Beet, who had saved her from Schwartz's insane rage upon losing his body. After seeing Gaohm kill Hidra, Jera rebels against her former leader. Seeing Gaohm in his true form, Jera is mortally wounded and cast back down to Earth. After being found by the B-Fighters, her mask disappears, revealing her as a blonde, Caucasian woman. Before dying, she reveals how the B-Fighters could infiltrate Gaohm's ship.
 : Actually a computer virus given a mechanical body, he is a maniacal android who can shoot electricity from his hands. He makes himself a special umbrella that allows him to fly, and can be used as a weapon. It was later destroyed by the B-Fighters newly acquired Pulsabers. When Jera left Jamahl and Gigaro dies, Schwartz takes on the B-Fighters on his own, adopting a new tank-like form called . His body was destroyed in the process by Stagger Tank and Red Gyro's Attack Formation, though his head survived. However, the damage left Schwartz critically insane. Schwartz even tried to kill Jera, but she was saved by Black Beet. He took control of various objects on Earth (one of them being a Giant Stone Statue which was destroyed by the Mega Beet Formation) before his "immortal head" was blasted into outer space to orbit Earth for all eternity.
 : A creature composed of various animal parts like a blue whale-shaped flattop, clamshell-like shoulders, and a frog-like left leg. Gigaro was originally a skeletal creature on a desert planet in the Garo dimension, hunted for unknown reasons by humanoids. Exhausted and near death, Gaohm gives him a new powerful body and recruits him into Jamahl. Gigaro uses a white bone-like sword and his flattop could open to reveal a gun. Gigaro imbued himself with life energy meant for the Jamahl to power-up into , a red and white version of himself with a crab-like left arm, clam-like features, and more power. Defeated by Super Blue Beet, he was ultimately killed by Gaohm who wanted Gigaro's life energy to hasten the completion of the Jamahl Hole. Gigaro was originally supposed to be revived/absorbed by Jagul, but Mai and Kabuto's interference left Gigaro to remain dead and Jagul with a weak point on her new body.
 : A mysterious woman in insectoid armor that Gaohm commissioned to create an evil B-Fighter. Jagul sent a long-horned beetle to bite Takuya and take a DNA sample from him. From the beetle and Takuya's cells, Jagul created Shadow/Black Beet. She is seemingly killed by Black Beet, but resurfaces long after Jamahl was destroyed and starts kidnapping young women including Mai and Sara and resurrecting defeated monsters to battle the heroes including Gagamoth's first form and Iluba from B-Fighter as well as Queen (Blue S.W.A.T.'s enemy), Bill Goldy (Janperson's enemy), and assorted aliens that Blue S.W.A.T. had fought in their series. Jagul soon transforms into a composite-entity with eight arms, the faces of Gaohm's second form, Black Beet, and the various resurrected creatures (consisting of Bagma Virus, Death Mult, Death Launcher, Ikari-Bomber 2, Macho Number 5, Shinigamian, Mojana, Maskuder, Hellsgyra, Jisp, Reiko Ayanokouji, and some of the aliens fought by Blue SWAT such as Zazanga and a second Bona) on her after reviving/absorbing them. She even betrays and absorbs Queen and Bill Goldy once they outlive their usefulness and their faces appeared on her. She trapped the B-Fighters, Janperson, Gun Gibson, and the Blue S.W.A.T. team in a pocket dimension, but Blue Beet escapes and hits Jagul's weak point (where Gigaro's face was supposed to go when he was revived to be absorbed by Jagul) to release the others. She was mortally wounded by the ultimate attacks of Super Blue Beet, Hyper Shou, and Janperson's Flash Cannon which regressed her to her previous form. Afterwards, she is dragged into death by Bill Goldy.
 : An evil clone of Takuya made by Jagul. Shadow is highly powerful, and by raising his  and shouting , became a formidable opponent to the other B-Fighters as Black Beet, whose armor was modeled after a Longhorn beetle. To prove his own existence, he tries to kill Takuya. Because he was a short‐lived clone, Shadow couldn't survive on his own and sought Saint Papilia's power to obtain immortality for himself. His weapons are a black Input Magnum known as the Jamming Magnum, and an extending hand-claw known as the Stinger Byoot. He falls because his longevity was lost though he stabs Blue Beet with his weapon.
 : Faceless foot soldiers that serve Gaohm in menial tasks. Gaohm has his own  red versions of the Jamar that are more powerful than the normal yellow ones. The bodyguards can only be destroyed by destroying their head and can reassemble themselves as well as blast lasers from their eyes.
 : Wasp-like jet fighters piloted by the Jamars, and can use their stingers as missiles.

Jamahl Kaijin
The  come in different armies, each led by one of the three Jamahl generals.

Mercenary Army
Some of these warriors are humans wearing armor.

 : A skull-headed swordsman who carries a large sword and was the first of Jamahl's soldiers to be sent to Earth to enslave the humans. He is about to kill Daisuke and Rei for resisting until they become B-Fighters as Blue Beet arrives. Taken to a blade-themed Gaohm Zone, Saberizer overpowers the B-Fighters until they bring out their Stinger Weapons and Saberizer is destroyed by Blue Beet's Beetle Break.
 : A cattle skull-helmeted warrior armed with an axe-bladed mace and shield, Zaiking joined Jera as she is the only person to defeat him in a duel. He is sent by Jera to ambush the B-Fighters while tracking down a special meteorite. Though he leaves the group due being a nature lover, Daisuke rejoins the B-Fighters when the Jamahl cause a massive forest fire to hold Blue Beet and Reddle at bay After using the B-Machines to put out the fire, the B-Fighters fight Zaiking in the Gaohm Zone before G-Stag disarms the mercenary and destroys him with Raging Slash. He is later revived for a competition, only to be destroyed by Hammer Kong.
 : A washed-out warrior who has long searched for the Pholon Jewel which gives whoever has it telekinetic power with a corruptive side effect. When it was found on Earth, Bardas is allowed to go and retrieve it. Though the B-Fighters interfere, Barda manages to claims the Pholon Jewel and inserts it into his head while battling the B-Fighters. However, using teamwork to shatter the Pholon Jewel, the B-Fighters easily destroy Barbas.
Barla arrives to help Jera in dealing with the B-Fighters. The two women overwhelm the B-Fighters and pursue them until the spirit of the Black Dragon reveals his true colors as he possess Barla so he can take revenge on Jera. After the B-Fighters weaken Black Dragon's hold over Barla, she stabs herself with a dagger to kill the dragon. Mortally wounded, Barla challenges Blue Beet to a duel and dies a warrior's death to Jera's horror.
  is an armored samurai warrior that was sent to kill Mina, the last survivor of the Botania Dimension (one of the many dimensions that Jamahl had conquered). Her father sends her to Earth's dimension with the seeds of the Botania tribe, and erases her memory. The source of his power is his sword, which G-Stag destroys and finishes the weakened warrior using his Stinger Claw's Raging Slash. He is later revived and kills Death Launcher, but is killed by Sinbad. He was revived again by Jagul to fight the B-Fighters Blue SWAT, Janperson, and Gun Gibson.
  is a mercenary in a bird-shaped helmet that was originally one of Jera's soldiers. He is easily defeated by Blue Beet and Reddle. After this, Jera retrieves his body and decides to bring him back to life and make him a combination of all three monster army types, now dubbed . Though he still resembles himself, his armor is now red and sports a different helmet. Gigaro provides a scorpion's tail, bird-like feet, and dragon-like wings while Schwartz added built-in shoulder cannons with one shoulder cannon being in the shape of a lobster claw and another shoulder cannon being in the shape of a dragon head. Phantom Death Mult proved able to defeat the B-Fighters until the three generals started arguing about which weapon he should use. Phantom Death Mult was stalled by the conflicting orders long enough for the B-Fighters to defeat him. He was later resurrected by Gaohm to exterminate the B-Fighters and Sinbad. This time Sinbad destroys him. Phantom Death Mult was later revived and absorbed by Jagul in the series finale.
  is a Grim Reaper-like being with skull-shaped formations on his back. He has the power to summon and control the spirits of the dead. The spirits can resist his control if they have things to accomplish on Earth. One of the ghosts raised was a young girl named Yuri who wants to fall in love before she died and thus resisted crossing over. She falls in love with Takuya and helps him fight Shinigamian by helping the other ghosts realize they are just being used. Once Shinigamian was dead, the ghosts are free to return to the afterlife. Yuri follows this time, having fallen in love with Takuya and thus finishing her business. He was later revived and absorbed by Jagul in the series finale. 
  is nicknamed the Spider of Flame due to her spider-themed armor. In battle, Hidra could blast fire and smoke from her mouth as well as send out web threads to wrap/bind her enemies. She was assigned the job of capturing Guru so Gaohm could use him to gather the energy of the insects on the planet to complete the Jamahl Hole. Gaohm, secretly promises Hidra that she could take Jera's place, if she succeeded, which she did. Gaohm gives her an armband as proof of her new rank. However, the armband is actually a bomb. Despite Jera's learning of this and warning Hidra, Hidra explodes and dies but not before telling the B-Fighters to kill Gaohm for her.

Synthetic Beast Army

 : A reptilian humanoid with a long snake draped over the head area that serves as his arms, he is the first of the Synthetic Beasts to be summoned when Gaohm had the remaining humans that Saberiza abducted converted into his slaves via the Jamahl Melody. Using the brain-washed humans, Heavyznake puts the B-Fighters at a disadvantage until they sneak into their base and destroy the source of the Jamahl Melody. With the plan a failure, the Heavyznake battles the B-Fighters before the barrier is destroyed. Taking the fight to the Gaohm Zone, Heavyznake's snake is blasted off to reveal his true snake-like head and arms while using the dimension to his advantage. However, weakened by the B-Weapons, Heavysnake is destroyed by Blue Beet's Beetle Break.
 : A gnat-like monster created by Gigaro, able to shrink himself to microscopic size and infiltrate any one's body to take control. He is sent by Gigaro to infect the B-Fighters' Insect Armor, asexually reproducing himself to enter G-Stag and Reddle. Using the two B-Fighters, Bagma planned to use them to attack a plasma plant and cause a meltdown. Realizing Bagma cannot thrive in freezing temperatures, Blue Beet uses this to force the monster out of his frozen allies before thawing them out. However, an offshoot of Bagma possesses Hikari and uses her to install a bomb. But when Bagma Virus is destroyed by Beetle Break, his extension in Hikari was destroyed as Mukai disarms the bomb in time. Bagma Virus is later revived and killed by Sinbad. He was revived a second time and absorbed by Jagul in the series finale.
 : A hunchbacked gray-furred four-eyed rat monster that Gigaro created who is able to roll up into a ball. He is sent to gnaw through underground power cables and cause mass panic. However, Garinezu has Ailurophobia so severe that he runs from a fight at the sight of a cat. To solve the issue, Gigaro forces Garinezu to run a hundred times through a maze with Jamar soldiers holding kidnapped cats at every corner. Cured of his phobia, Garinezu resumes his mission before the B-Fighters find him. Taking the fight to the Gaohm Zone, Garinezu is destroyed by Beetle Break. Later revived, but dies in a suicide attempt to kill Blue Beet.
  is a monster whose body is covered in bony plates. He can control the bones strewn around his island, extending them and using them to capture the B-Fighters. Hellsgyra is beaten by the combined powers and strength of Drago and Blue Beet. He was revived and absorbed by Jagul in the series finale.
 : A horned sloth monster who is extremely lazy much to Gigaro's dismay. Gigaro attempted to kill his creation until he was convinced by Gaohm to have the Synthetic Beast pose as a bus driver and use his tongue to suck the energy out of people to become active while they became lazy. Though he takes the energy of the male B-Fighters, the Insects restore their drive as they come to Reddle's aid. Unable to take the infinite energy now powering them, Namakeruge is destroyed by Beetle Break. Later revived, he dies in a suicide attempt to kill Blue Beet.
  is a pig monster with big ears and broken tusks who can breathe a white gas that steals human voices, reducing them to grunts and squeals. He can breathe fire and blast lasers from his tusks. Reddle finishes him off with the Stinger Plasmar. Later revived, he dies in a suicide attempt to kill Blue Beet.
  is a mantis monster whose mission is to spread her eggs throughout the city, injecting them into people using her long, spiked tongue. The eggs would then grow inside their hosts. Kamazakiller is killed by Blue Beet's new weapon, the Stinger Drill, using the Strike Blast. She is later revived only to be killed by G-Stag with help from Sinbad.
  is a red-shelled crab/shrimp combination monster with four arms who emits a liquid that turns ordinary water into poison. He could deflect shots from his shelled armor as well as blast water as strong pulses. After Daisaku's father tries to stop him from polluting the water, Ebigaanya sets him adrift with a bomb in his boat. Daisaku overcomes his fear of the water and saves his father, and returns to battle Shrimpcrabya. He is killed by a hot water blast from the Input Magnums, which cook him and incapacitate him. G-Stag finishes him with the Raging Slash.
  is an amoeba monster who wears a gold mask with rows of faces surround it while nested on each other, extending in a star-like pattern. Maskuder disguises himself as a plastic surgeon able to make anyone beautiful with his special masks. The masks give his customers the face of the famous model Mizuzu Shiratori, who happens to be a childhood friend of Mai's. These masks, however, are explosive control devices that let Maskuder control the wearers and detonate them when he breaks his own mask, which is his central gold face. Under the gold mask is a single eye. Maskuder can also cause explosions on command. He was later revived and absorbed by Jagul in the series finale.
  is a species of other dimensional creatures that Gigaro gave to several children in the guise of a salesman. He told the children that if the creatures acted up, to hit them with a special stick. The stick actually causes the Moja to become fierce creatures that absorb the consciousness of the one who hits them. The creatures eventually gather and transform into the moth-headed monster . Mojanga can breathe fire. The children's consciousness is trapped inside Mojanga. Though the children try to urge the B-Fighters to fight, Mojanga can reverse what the consciousnesses trapped inside him said. Eventually Daisaku went inside Mojanga's body and freed the children. He was later revived and absorbed by Jagul in the series finale.
  is at first an energy-sucking caterpillar monster, but it metamorphoses into a red moth monster when it absorbs the Beet Ingram's power. In this form, its right and left arms end transform into duplicates of the Input Magnum and Stinger Blade respectively. It was the first to be destroyed by the newly born Super Blue Beet. Gagamoth could also flap its wings and release destructive pollen. Gagamoth's caterpillar form is later revived by Jagul to fight the B-Fighters, Blue SWAT, Janperson, and Gun Gibson.
  is a monster created from the fictional "Rasbel" flower, a carnivorous plant that can move on its own and feeds on small animals. Although almost invincible, Rasbelga's only weakness is the fruit of a tree discovered by Sayuri, an old girlfriend of Mukai's, which makes him spit out the people he swallows & disables his pollen spray so he can be defeated. Aside from spraying destructive pollen, it can launch vines from its mouth and strangle enemies. Mukai tries to stop Rasbelga, by wearing bulky armor, calling himself "Mukaider K-3", though the armor gradually falls apart as he fights. Despite this, Mukai's actions enable Blue Beet to help G-Stag and Reddle, who are stuck within Rasbelga's stomach, to break free and finish the monster with Blue Beet's Stinger Drill.
  is a legendary fire-breathing cat monster that is fossilized and unable to move. Gigaro has Schwartz use a youth-restoring machine to bring back Figer, but Schwartz sets it too high and the edition of Faigar that appears is a child who breathes fire towards anyone around him including Gigaro. While trying to stop it, Blue Beet tackles Figer and is hit by the residual youth energy that is in it, turning Takuya into a child. Gigaro and Schwartz eventually recapture Figer with candy so they can place him back into the machine to age him to a more dangerous age. They overdo it and the Figer that emerges is blackened and burnt. Blue Beet uses this chance to restore his own age, then destroys Figer with the Super Final Blow.
  is the spirit of a bear who is hunted and killed in the mountains by humans. Feeling a bond, Gigaro rekindles Giga-Tsukinowa's hatred of humans and makes him a bloodthirsty monster whom Gigaro used for his "B-Fighter Hunt". Giga-Tsukinowa captures a young friend of Mai, though it appears to show compassion upon seeing a teddy bear that the young girl has with her. Eventually defeated by the team.

Combat-Mecha Army

 : A silver and gold robot with giant hammers on his hands and a head in the shape of a hammer head with the striking surface being his face that has one eye. He can pound his hands on the ground to create Hammer Crush shock waves, or toss them in his Hammer Boomerang attack while firing a "Kong Beam" from his single eye & spit giant nails to pin his enemies to a wall. He is uses in Schwartz's scheme to force the B-Fighters into submission by holding children hostage. After saving the children, the B-Fighter battle Hammer Kong in the Gahom Zone before they take out the Combat-Robot's visual sensors and destroys him with a Beetle Break/Tornado Spark combo. Hammer Kong is later rebuilt and dies in a suicide attempt on Reddle.
 : A green robot with missile launchers on his shoulders and gun batteries on his wrists, used by Schwartz as an enforcer in a scheme to use the Jamahl Wave machine to turn all machines against humans, including the B-Machines. Luckily for the B-Fighters, their B-Commanders cannot be controlled as they don their Insect Armor to fight Death Launcher. After Blue Beet destroys the Jamahl Wave machine, he uses his Beetle Break to destroy Death Launcher. Later rebuilt in episode 30, only to be destroyed again by Iluba. He was later revived and absorbed by Jagul in the series finale.
 : A camera-based robot with flashbulb eyes, Gamerio disguises himself as a photographer and goes around taking pictures of people with an instant camera. Those who got their pictures taken, are eventually spirited off into another dimension to work at a Jamahl slave quarry. Among his targets is Rei, unaware that she was a B-Fighter. However, Rei learns that Gamerio's transport system can be disrupted by high-frequency sound waves and uses a dog whistle to disrupt the Combat Robot's systems and teleport the children back to Earth. Taking the fight to the Gaohm Zone, Gamerio converts into full-on battle mode before being destroyed by Beetle Break. He was later rebuilt, but Reddle destroys him.
 : A prideful and arrogant hand grenade-based robot with a short-fused temper who detonates whenever someone makes him mad, causing an explosion of tremendous power before reforming himself. Sent to Aoyama City, Ikari-Bomber holds the city hostage and force them into slavery in the renamed Jamahl City. After learning the best way to defeat Ikari-Bomber is to take out the detonation/reconstruction chip in his head module, the B-Fighters set up a scheme to take out the chip with the experimental EIG ray gun while Daisaku distracts Ikari Bomber. Once the plan succeeds, the B-Fighters use the Red Gyro to carry Ikari-Bomber away from the city so he can be safely blown up by the Beetluder and Stagger Tank's guns. However, during a battle at a junkyard, Ikari-Bomber 2 accidentally incorporated a hair clipper into his body, grafting onto his left hand. Overcome by the hair clipper's desire to cut hair and to grudge on those who had discarded it when it was still usable, Ikari-Bomber 2 goes on a head-shaving spree until the B-Fighters destroyed his component pieces one by one. Ikari-Bomber 2 was rebuilt in Episode 30, but was destroyed off-screen. He was revived yet again as Ikari-Bomber 2 and absorbed by Jagul in the series finale.
  is a white robot with a dome-like head and a rounded chest that can open up into a large mirror, and anyone whose reflection he captures in the mirror could be trapped inside, allowing Gagamirror to assume their shape. He sucks Takuya into his mirror and disguised as Takuya, he infiltrates the Juukou Base. Rei penetrates the deception when Gagamirror steps on flowers as he took a young boy who Takuya knew to see the Beet Machines (earlier, Takuya had swerved and crashed the Beetluder to avoid hitting some flowers). He was killed by the Beetle Break.
  is a blue robot with red circles on his chest, elbows, and shoulders, and black spikes on his arms, legs, and head. Dangar's mission is to eliminate the escapee Lala, who had been forced to help build the Death Gaohm, a super-cannon that could destroy an entire country in one blast. Lala is actually a scientist from the Aroa dimension and although she falls in love with Takuya, she returns home after Dangar and the Death Gaohm are destroyed. Later was revived, but killed by G-Stag.
  is Schwartz's older brother, though Schwartz actually built him with his own two mechanical hands. He is muscular with blue and white armor plating and a face/faceplate like Schwartz's. He is injured in a battle with the B-Fighters. Mostly to save him, Schwartz enters Macho's head to pilot him personally. Macho's final plan to rid them of the B-Fighters is to destroy himself. He tells Schwartz to leave his body, but his brother refused. Seconds before his death, at the hands of Super Blue Beet, Macho ejects Schwartz to save him. The only remains Schwartz found later is Macho's eyepiece which he takes as a memento. He vows to defeat the B-Fighters for his brother. Macho No.5 was later revived and absorbed by Jagul in the series finale.

Episodes
 : written by Junichi Miyashita, directed by Shinichiro Sawai
 : written by Junichi Miyashita, directed by Shinichiro Sawai
 : written by Junichi Miyashita, directed by Kaneharu Mitsumura 
 : written by Junichi Miyashita, directed by Kaneharu Mitsumura 
 : written by Junichi Miyashita, directed by Taro Sakamoto
 : written by Nobuo Ogizawa, directed by Taro Sakamoto 
 : written by Kyoko Sagiyama, directed by Hidenori Ishida
 : written by Akira Asaka, directed by Hidenori Ishida
 : written by Nobuo Ogizawa, directed by Hidenori Ishida
 : written by Akira Asaka, directed by Kaneharu Mitsumura 
 : written by Yasuko Kobayashi, directed by Kaneharu Mitsumura 
 : written by Nobuo Ogizawa, directed by Taro Sakamoto 
 : written by Junichi Miyashita, directed by Taro Sakamoto
 : written by Junichi Miyashita, directed by Katsuya Watanabe
 : written by Nobuo Ogizawa, directed by Katsuya Watanabe
 : written by Kyoko Sagiyama, directed by Kaneharu Mitsumura 
 : written by Nobuo Ogizawa, directed by Kaneharu Mitsumura 
 : written by Akira Asaka, directed by Osamu Kaneda
 : written by Junichi Miyashita, directed by Osamu Kaneda
 : written by Junichi Miyashita, directed by Taro Sakamoto 
 : written by Nobuo Ogizawa, directed by Taro Sakamoto 
 : written by Junichi Miyashita, directed by Kaneharu Mitsumura 
 : written by Nobuo Ogizawa, directed by Kaneharu Mitsumura 
 : written by Junichi Miyashita, directed by Hidenori Ishida
 : written by Kyoko Sagiyama, directed by Hidenori Ishida
 : written by Akira Asaka, directed by Taro Sakamoto 
 : written by Nobuo Ogizawa, directed by Taro Sakamoto 
 : written by Junichi Miyashita, directed by Osamu Kaneda 
 : written by Junichi Miyashita, directed by Osamu Kaneda
 : written by Akira Asaka, directed by Kaneharu Mitsumura 
 : written by Akira Asaka, directed by Kaneharu Mitsumura 
 : written by Nobuo Ogizawa, directed by Katsuya Watanabe
 : written by Junichi Miyashita, directed by Katsuya Watanabe 
 : written by Kyoko Sagiyama, directed by Taro Sakamoto
 : written by Junichi Miyashita, directed by Taro Sakamoto 
 : written by Junichi Miyashita, directed by Taro Sakamoto 
 : written by Nobuo Ogizawa, directed by Kaneharu Mitsumura 
 : written by Akira Asaka, directed by Kaneharu Mitsumura 
 : written by Kyoko Sagiyama, directed by Osamu Kaneda 
 : written by Junichi Miyashita, directed by Osamu Kaneda
 : written by Nobuo Ogizawa, directed by Hidenori Ishida
 : written by Kyoko Sagiyama, directed by Hidenori Ishida
 : written by Junichi Miyashita, directed by Taro Sakamoto 
 : written by Junichi Miyashita, directed by Taro Sakamoto
 : written by Akira Asaka, directed by Kaneharu Mitsumura 
 : written by Nobuo Ogizawa, directed by Katsuya Watanabe 
 : written by Nobuo Ogizawa, directed by Katsuya Watanabe 
 : written by Nobuo Ogizawa, directed by Kaneharu Mitsumura 
 : written by Junichi Miyashita, directed by Taro Sakamoto 
 : written by Junichi Miyashita, directed by Taro Sakamoto 
 : written by Junichi Miyashita, directed by Taro Sakamoto 
 : written by Yasuko Kobayashi, directed by Kaneharu Mitsumura 
 : written by Yasuko Kobayashi, directed by Kaneharu Mitsumura

Film
 Juukou B-Fighter (04/15/95)
 Script: Junichi Miyashita
 Director: Osamu Kaneda

Cast
Takuya Kai: 
Daisaku Katagiri: 
Rei Hayama: 
Mai Takatori: 
Kenzo Mukai: 
Shadow: Jiro Okamoto, Seiji Takaiwa (29), 
Jera/Gira:  (1-50)/Shelley Sweeney (50)

Voice actors
Rei Hayama (14-21): 
Sage Guru: 
Kabuto: 
Gaohm: 
Gigaro: Toshimichi Takahashi
Schwartz: 
Jera: 
Jagul: 
Black Beet (19-43): 
Saint Papilia: 
Narrator, Mega Herakles:

Guest actors
 Haruka (1, 2 & 44): Chizu Momochi
 Haruka's Father (1 & 2): Kenji Ohba
 Haruka's Mother (1 & 2): Fusaku Kenmotsu
Show Narumi: 
Sara Misugi: 
Sig: 
Ryuzaburo Tatewaki: 
Queen:

Guest voice actors
Janperson: 
Gun Gibson:

Songs
Opening theme

Lyrics: 
Composition: 
Arrangement: 
Artist: 

Ending theme

Lyrics: Yoko Aki
Composition: Ryudo Uzaki
Arrangement: Katsunori Ishida
Artist: Shinichi Ishihara

External links
 

Japanese science fiction television series
Television series about insects
Fictional soldiers
Metal Hero Series
1995 Japanese television series debuts
1996 Japanese television series endings
TV Asahi original programming
Japan Self-Defense Forces in fiction